The following is a detailed list of results and scores from National Football League games aired on Thursday Night Football. Starting with the 2006 NFL season, NFL Network was awarded the rights to air Thursday night games (with some extra broadcasts on Saturday nights). Previously, games played on Thursdays were broadcast on TNT and ESPN.  In 2014, CBS Sports shared rights with NFL Network for the package, with NBC Sports joining CBS and NFL Network in 2016. In 2017 until 2021, Amazon Prime Video acquired non-exclusive streaming rights to stream all of the broadcast portion of Thursday Night Football games. In 2018, Fox Sports began to share rights with the NFL Network.  Starting in 2022, Amazon became the exclusive home of Thursday Night Football, with the NFL Network airing select late season Saturday games.

Results by season
Listed below are games and their respective results played from 2006 to the present.

2000s

2006 season

Additional notes
According to Nielsen Media Research, the Broncos-Chiefs game that opened this package was the highest-rated program on cable/satellite TV in the United States on November 23, 2006, with a 6.8 rating (among available households) and an average of 4.2 million households. These numbers are especially remarkable, considering that millions of potential fans were unable to see the game due to their cable systems not making it available to them.

2007 season

2008 season

2009 season
The 2009 season featured a Friday night game on December 25, as the Thursday that week was Christmas Eve, and the NFL tried not to schedule games that night in deference to the holiday (a lone exception being a Monday Night Football game in 2007 due to scheduling conflicts caused by ESPN's broadcast contracts). Also, the start times were pushed back by five minutes, to 8:20 p.m. Eastern time (except for the December 25 game, starting at 7:30 PM EST/6:30 CST).

2010s

2010 season

2011 season

2012 season
Starting with this season, the NFL expanded to a full season Thursday Night Football schedule. However, there were some changes with the biggest being that every team was guaranteed a prime-time appearance. In addition to the season opener, the prime-time Thanksgiving game also aired on NBC.

2013 season

2014 season
Starting with the 2014 season, the NFL and CBS signed a deal that would put part of the Thursday Night Football package on national prime-time. CBS, with an NFL Network simulcast, would air eight games (mostly the first half), while the NFL Network would air the other eight games (mostly the second half) exclusively. The deal was for one year with the option of a second year in 2015, which the NFL chose to exercise.

2015 season

2016 season 
For the 2016 and 2017 seasons, a new Thursday Night Football deal took effect.  Thursday Night Football was now an 18-game schedule with CBS broadcasting 5 games, NBC broadcasting 5 games, and the NFL Network simulcasting the whole season with 8 games exclusively.  CBS Sports and NBC Sports each produced 4 NFL Network-only games.  The NFL also sold the digital rights to the package separately to Twitter.  Due to scheduling conflicts, NBC Sports had Mike Tirico team up with Cris Collinsworth for the Giants-Eagles game. Tirico, Doug Flutie, and Tony Dungy also called Dolphins-Jets and Ravens-Steelers.

2017 season 
2017 marked the second and final year of the NFL's Thursday Night Football contract with CBS and NBC, as Fox would take over next season. Also, Amazon replaced Twitter as the digital rights holder. Also, along with the change in digital viewing, it was announced that there were 11 games simulcast between CBS, NBC, and NFL Network. While CBS kept the original 5 games, NBC simulcasted 6 games with NFL Network. Also, the change meant that CBS produced 4 NFL Network-only games, while NBC produced 3 NFL Network-only games, including a Week 15 Saturday doubleheader. In addition, Mike Tirico replaced Al Michaels full-time on Thursday night games. Tirico became the new studio host, replacing Bob Costas, who retired from many major jobs with the network, like the Olympics. Michaels focused on Sunday night games, while Tirico handled Thursday nights with Cris Collinsworth or Kurt Warner.

2018 season
2018 marked the first year of Thursday Night Football on Fox.  Fox Sports produced all 18 regular season games with 11 of those games on the Fox network (between weeks 4–15). Starting in 2018, the NFL moved the start time of Thursday Night Football back, from 8:25 p.m. ET to 8:20 p.m. ET.  All TNF games on Fox were streamed online via Amazon Prime Video, who replaced Twitter in 2017, under the CBS/NBC contract, with fellow Amazon subsidiary Twitch streaming all games as well with Prime Video.

2019 season

2020s

2020 season 
The Vikings-Saints Christmas game kicked off at 4:30 p.m. ET.  Week 15 and 16 had games on Saturday. For Week 15, the following two games were flexed: Bills-Broncos, and Panthers-Packers. For Week 16, the following three games were flexed: Buccaneers-Lions, 49ers-Cardinals (Prime Video only), and Dolphins-Raiders.  Due to the COVID-19 pandemic, all international series games were moved back to the United States. Also, some games involving teams that had COVID outbreaks, had games moved back. This was the case with two games on the TNF schedule.

2021 season 
Beginning with the 2021 season, the NFL expanded to a 17-game season. This was Fox's last season covering TNF, as the rights shifted to Amazon Prime exclusively in the 2022 season.

2022 season
Thursday Night Football will start exclusively streaming on Prime Video in 2022. However, the games will also be simulcast by local affiliates in teams' home markets. While the entire schedule was released on May 12, the first Amazon-exclusive Thursday Night game, Chargers-Chiefs, was unveiled during the first round of the 2022 NFL Draft on April 28. All games air on Thursday nights at 8:15 PM ET. Because of NFL rules, all games will be simulcast on a over-the-air television station in the home markets of the teams playing.

2023 season

See also 
NFL on television
NBC Sunday Night Football
NBC Sunday Night Football results
Monday Night Football results (1970–1989)
Monday Night Football results (1990–2009)
Monday Night Football results (2010–present)
2007 New England Patriots–New York Giants game

References
NFL Network Official Website
NFL.com/Live – NFL Network Run to the Playoffs Online Broadcast

Thursday Night Football results
Thursday Night Football results
Thursday Night Football results
Thursday Night Football results
Thursday Night Football results
Thursday Night Football results
Thursday Night Football results
Thursday Night Football results
Thursday Night Football results
Run to the Playoffs results
Results (2006-present)